Konstantin Alekseyevich Kuchinsky (born 15 July 1998) is a Belarusian professional footballer who plays for Gomel.

Honours
Gomel
Belarusian Cup winner: 2021–22

References

External links 
 
 

1998 births
Living people
Belarusian footballers
Association football defenders
Belarus youth international footballers
Belarus under-21 international footballers
FC Energetik-BGU Minsk players
FC Dinamo Minsk players
FC Lida players
FC Belshina Bobruisk players
FC Gomel players